S-phrases are defined in Annex IV of European Union Directive 67/548/EEC: Safety advice concerning dangerous substances and preparations. The list was consolidated and republished in Directive 2001/59/EC, where translations into other EU languages may be found. The list was subsequently updated and republished in Directive 2006/102/EC, where translations to additional European languages were added.

These safety phrases are used internationally and not just in Europe, and there is an ongoing effort towards complete international harmonization. (Note: missing S-number combinations indicate phrases that were deleted or replaced by another phrase.)

Safety phrases

See also 
 List of R-phrases
 GHS precautionary statements
 GHS hazard statements
 Material safety data sheet   
 Risk and Safety Statements

References

External links 
 Chemical Risk & Safety Phrases in 23 European Languages
 ChemBlink.com EC Safety Phrases
 Directive 2006/102/EC of 20 November 2006, as published in Official Journal of the European Union L 363, 20 December 2006, pp. 241-343
 https://ec.europa.eu/taxation_customs/dds2/SAMANCTA/EN/Safety/RS_EN.htm 

Occupational safety and health
International standards
Safety codes